Frantisekia is a genus of wood-decay fungi in the family Steccherinaceae.

Species
Frantisekia abieticola H.S.Yuan (2013)
Frantisekia fissiliformis (Pilát) Spirin & Zmitr. (2007)
Frantisekia mentschulensis (Pilát ex Pilát) Spirin (2007)
Frantisekia ussurii (Y.C.Dai & Niemelä) Spirin (2007)

References

Polyporales genera
Steccherinaceae
Taxa described in 2007